Abraham Kanime (born 1960) is a Namibian police officer who serves as the Chief of the country's only metropolitan Police force, the Windhoek City Police.

Early life

Kanime was born in 1960 in Omusati Region of northern Namibia. He went to school in the then South West Africa during the time of SWAPO's struggles for independence from the South African apartheid regime.

Police career

Kanime has been a member of the Namibian Police Force since 1995. In 2004, he helped found the Windhoek City Police. That same year, he was appointed as chief of Windhoek municipality's police division. Kanime was suspended from his position in 2018 by the City of Windhoek's chief executive after almost two decades in office; leading to infighting within the city's Police division. In January 2019, president Hage Geingob ordered that Kanime and the city's CEO, Robert Kahimise be reinstated immediately. In May 2020, some city councillors called for Kanime's reappointment to be rescinded, on the grounds of corruption within the process.

References

Living people
1960 births
People from Oshana Region